The 1940 United States presidential election in Nebraska took place on November 5, 1940, as part of the 1940 United States presidential election. Voters chose seven representatives, or electors, to the Electoral College, who voted for president and vice president.

Nebraska was won by Wendell Willkie (R–New York), running with Minority Leader Charles L. McNary, with 57.19% of the popular vote, against incumbent President Franklin D. Roosevelt (D–New York), running with Secretary Henry A. Wallace, with 42.81% of the popular vote.

With 57.19% of the popular vote, Nebraska would prove to be Willkie's second strongest state in the 1940 election in terms of popular vote percentage after neighboring South Dakota.

Results

Results by county

See also
 United States presidential elections in Nebraska

References

Nebraska
1940
1940 Nebraska elections